The room-temperature densification method was developed for Li2MoO4 ceramics and is based on the water-solubility of Li2MoO4. It can be used for the fabrication of Li2MoO4 ceramics instead of conventional thermal sintering. The method utilizes a small amount of aqueous phase formed by moistening the Li2MoO4 powder. The densification occurs during sample pressing as the solution incorporates the pores between the powder particles and recrystallizes. The contact points of the particles provide a high pressure zone, where solubility is increased, whereas the pores act as a suitable place for the precipitation of the solution. Any residual water is removed by post-processing typically at 120 °C. The method is suitable also for Li2MoO4 composite ceramics with up to 30 volume-% of filler material, enabling the optimization of the dielectric properties.

References

Ceramic engineering 
Ceramic materials 
Materials science